Roque Benjamín Fernández (born April 30, 1947) is an Argentine economist, former President of the Central Bank and Minister of Economy, and the only member of the Chicago Boys ever to have been the chief economic policy maker in Argentina.

Early years
Fernández was born in Córdoba, Argentina, and holds a CPA from the National University of Córdoba and a PhD in economics from the same university. In 1973 he obtained a scholarship from the Ford Foundation and went on to earn a PhD in economics from the University of Chicago in 1975.

Academics
Since its foundation in 1978, he has been a member of the Board of Directors and Faculty of the Universidad del CEMA, where he taught monetary theory.

Central Bank
Fernández was appointed president of the Central Bank of Argentina on February 5, 1991, by recommendation of the new Economy Minister, Domingo Cavallo.

As such, he was instrumental in managing the Argentine Currency Board that served as a guarantor of Cavallo's Convertibility Plan in its early years, and which helped maintain a 1:1 parity between the Argentine peso and the US dollar.

He remained at the post until August 4, 1996, when President Carlos Menem removed Cavallo following a political dispute, and Fernández became Minister of Economy on August 6, 1996, serving in that capacity until Menem's retirement on December 10, 1999.

Minister of Economy
During his tenure, Fernández earned plaudits for helping maintain a steady exchange rate and zero inflation, and doing so despite repeated international shocks, such as the Mexican, Asian, and Russian financial crises.

Return to academics
Fernández is currently professor of macroeconomic analysis (graduate) and macroeconomics I (undergraduate) at University of CEMA. He was also visiting professor in the University of Southern California, Florida International University, University of Chile, Pontifical Catholic University of Chile, and has worked as a consultant and economist for the World Bank and the International Monetary Fund.

His major areas of interest are banks, financial systems in developing nations, fiscal and monetary policy, exchange rate policy, balance of payments and financial crisis.

As a researcher, he is author of several books and publications, including articles in the American Economic Review and Journal of Political Economy. He is a member of the Academia Nacional de Ciencias Economicas.

See also
 Universidad del CEMA
 Economic history of Argentina
 Chicago School of Economics

References

External links

 Statement by Mr. Roque B. Fernández at the IMF meeting in 1999
 Roque Fernández at IDEAS
  Roque Fernández in Fortuna Magazine
 

1947 births
Living people
People from Córdoba, Argentina
Argentine people of Spanish descent
Presidents of the Central Bank of Argentina
Argentine Ministers of Finance
National University of Córdoba alumni
University of Chicago alumni
Argentine economists